Rhynchopyga semirufa is a species of moth in the subfamily Arctiinae. It is found in Peru.

References

Natural History Museum Lepidoptera generic names catalog

Moths described in 1906
Euchromiina